The Eastern School District of Newfoundland and Labrador (ESDNL) was the de facto school board for the eastern portion of the island of Newfoundland, in the Canadian province of Newfoundland and Labrador.  Its headquarters was in St. John's and there were regional offices in Spaniard's Bay, Burin and Clarenville. The district served approximately 40,000 students with 4,200 staff and teachers. It was amalgamated in 2013 into the Newfoundland and Labrador English School District. 

The last CEO/Director of Education was Dr. Bruce Vey, who was appointed in October 2012.
Previous directors include Ford Rice, Darrin Pike, who was appointed Deputy Minister of the Department of Education in 2009, and Dr. Darin King, who joined the district in 2004 and departed to enter provincial politics where he served as Minister of Education.

Schools
The Eastern School District managed 119 schools in four regions, including the following high schools and schools with school grades:

Avalon East Regional Schools
 Mary Queen of the World Elementary School
East Point elementary  
 Baltimore School Complex
Bishops College
 Booth Memorial High School
 Gonzaga Regional High School
Holy Heart of Mary High School
Holy Spirit High School
 Holy Trinity High School
 Janeway Hospital School
 Mobile Central High School
 Mount Pearl Senior High School
 O'Donel High School
 Prince of Wales Collegiate
 Queen Elizabeth Regional High School
 St. Anne's Academy
 St. Kevin's High School
 St. Michael's High School

Avalon West Regional Schools
 Ascension Collegiate
 Baccalieu Collegiate
 Carbonear Collegiate
 Crescent Collegiate

Burin Regional Schools
 Christ the King School (Dunne Memorial Academy)
 Fatima Academy
 Laval High School
 Roncalli Central High School
 St. Catherine's Academy
 Christ the King School
 Fortune Bay Academy
 Holy Name of Mary
 John Burke High School
 Marystown Central High
 St. Joseph's Academy
 St. Joseph's All Grade
 St. Lawrence Academy

Vista Regional Schools (including Clarenville and Bonavista Peninsula):
 Bishop White School
 Clarenville High School
 Discovery Collegiate
 Heritage Collegiate
 Random Island Academy
 Southwest Arm Academy
 St. Mark's School
 Swift Current Academy
 Tricentia Academy

References

External links 
 The Eastern School District of Newfoundland and Labrador homepage
 School District list of schools

School districts in Newfoundland and Labrador
2013 disestablishments in Newfoundland and Labrador